PT Nissan Motor Indonesia (also called NMI) is a subsidiary of Nissan Motor Company in Indonesia. The company was founded in 2001 and headquartered in Jakarta, Indonesia. Previously, Nissan vehicles were distributed by PT Indocitra Buana (established 1986), a joint venture company between Indomobil Group and Bimantara Citra. Together with PT Nissan Motor Distributor Indonesia, these companies acts as both national sales/distribution company and formerly a manufacturing company.

In January 2019, NMI closed their Plant 1 in Purwakarta, effectively ending the production of Grand Livina, X-Trail, Serena and Juke. The plant would be converted to an engine manufacturing plant for Mitsubishi. Meanwhile, Datsun models stay on production in their Plant 2 until its closure in January 2020. On 18 March 2020, President of NMI Isao Sekiguchi officially announced the end of Nissan vehicle manufacturing in Indonesia. Manufacturing previously based in Indonesia was moved to Thailand.

Models

Current models

Manufactured locally 
 Nissan Livina (2019–present, consignation from Mitsubishi Motors)

Imported 
 Nissan Kicks (2020–present)
 Nissan Leaf (2021–present)
 Nissan Magnite (2020–present)
 Nissan Serena (2019–present)
 Nissan Terra (2018–2020, 2023–present)
 Nissan X-Trail (2019–present)

Former models

Manufactured locally 
Nissan
 Nissan Evalia (2012–2016)
 Nissan Grand Livina (2007–2019)
 Nissan Juke (2011–2018)
 Nissan Livina (2008–2011)
 Nissan Livina X-Gear (2008–2015)
 Nissan March (2010–2013)
 Nissan Serena (2004–2019)
 Nissan Terrano (1995–2006)
 Nissan X-Trail (2003–2019)

Datsun
 Datsun Cross (2018–2020)
 Datsun Go Panca (2014–2020)
 Datsun Go+ Panca (2014–2020)

Imported 
Nissan
 Nissan 350Z
 Nissan Almera (fleet only)
 Nissan Cefiro
 Nissan Elgrand
 Nissan Frontier Navara
 Nissan Latio
 Nissan Latio sedan (fleet only)
 Nissan March
 Nissan NP300 Navara
 Nissan Pathfinder
 Nissan Patrol
 Nissan Sentra
 Nissan Silvia
 Nissan Teana

Infiniti
 Infiniti FX
 Infiniti G37 Coupe
 Infiniti I30
 Infiniti M37
 Infiniti Q50
 Infiniti QX70
 Infiniti QX80

Exports 

Between 2009 and 2014, NMI exported the locally assembled X-Trail to Malaysia and Thailand. NMI supplied the March/Micra to Australia between 2010 and 2013. From 2014 to 2017, the Juke and Livina X-Gear was exported to Thailand. The plant also exported the Grand Livina and Livina X-Gear by knock-down kits to Malaysia later to be assembled by Tan Chong Motor Assemblies between 2007 and 2019.

Annual sales 

Excluding Datsun and Infiniti sales

External links

 Official website

References 

Car manufacturers of Indonesia
Nissan
Manufacturing companies based in Jakarta
Vehicle manufacturing companies established in 1986
Indonesian companies established in 1986

de:IndoMobil Group#Nissan Motor Indonesia, PT.